Ashok Kumar (Benu) Dasgupta (born Kolkata, India, 7 March 1928; died 21 April 2010) was an Indian cricketer. He was active during the 1950s and played for the Bengal and Bihar cricket teams.

Dasgupta  was one of the main pillars of Bengal's batting in 1950s and recipient of Kartick Bose Lifetime Achievement Award from The Cricket Association Of Bengal in July 2008.

Career
Dasgupta was right-handed batsman and a right-arm medium pace bowler.  He appeared with the Bengal cricket team from the 1952/53 season through the 1955/56 season, and played one final season (1956/56) with the Bihar cricket team.

Record
 First class batting and fielding career

 First class bowling career

Personal
Dasgupta was born to Shrimati Saibolini Dasgupta and Shri Jitendra Nath Dasgupta (former Chairman of Calcutta Improvement Trust, Founder member of B.E.College of Engineering and an active member of Jadavpur University).  He completed his schooling from South Suburban School in South Calcutta. He completed his high school from Ashutosh College. He was a mechanical engineer, a student of
Jadavpur University. He worked with Gannon Dunkerly & Co. PVT. LTD.

Married to Shrimati Pranati Dasgupta.

Dasgupta was brother to two other Bengali cricketers of the 1950s: Anil Kumar Dasgupta and Ajit Kumar Dasgupta .

References

External links

1928 births
2010 deaths
Bengali cricketers
Cricketers from Kolkata
Indian cricketers
Bengal cricketers
Bihar cricketers
Asutosh College alumni